Harsvika is a village in the municipality of Åfjord in Trøndelag county, Norway.  It is located on the south side of the island of Stokkøya, in the Stoksund area in northwest Åfjord.  The north end of the Stokkøy Bridge lies just east of Harsvika, connecting it to the village of Revsnes on the mainland.

References

Villages in Trøndelag
Åfjord